Merpati Nusantara Airlines Flight 836 was a scheduled domestic flight between Sorong and Manokwari, Indonesia. On 13 April 2010, the flight, operated by Boeing 737-300 PK-MDE, overran the runway on landing. The aircraft broke into three pieces. All people on board survived, although 44 suffered injuries.

Accident
At 11:00 local time (02:00 UTC), Flight 836 overran the runway on landing at Rendani Airport, Manokwari, Indonesia on a scheduled domestic flight from Sorong Airport, Sorong. 44 people were injured, including ten seriously. The flight was carrying 103 passengers and six crew. The weather at the time was raining and misty. After departing the end of the runway, the aircraft struck some trees, tearing off the port wing. The tail of the aircraft broke off and came to rest in the creek off the northern end of Runway 35. The pilot was reported to have over 16,000 hours total time and the co-pilot over 22,000 hours total time.

Aircraft

The aircraft involved was a Boeing 737-322 registration PK-MDE, msn 24600. The aircraft first flew on 16 March 1990 and entered service with United Airlines on 2 April 1990. The aircraft finally delivered to Merpati Nusantara Airlines on 12 November 2009. The accident resulted the aircraft written off. At the time of the accident, it had completed about 54,700 hours in 38,450 cycles. The APU had been unserviceable since 10 April 2010. The destroyed aircraft is visible on Google Earth.

Consequences
As a result of the crash a total of seven safety recommendations were issued, five to the Indonesian Directorate General of Civil Aviation (DGCA) and two to the airline.  The DGCA was instructed to review numerous airport facilities against Indonesian safety regulations, as well as Merpati Nusantara's safety regulations, and ensure that they were met.  The airline was to conduct a review of its safety regulations, as well as a review of airports it serves to ensure that were capable of handling aircraft as large as a Boeing 737.

Gallery

References

2010 in Indonesia
Aviation accidents and incidents in 2010
Aviation accidents and incidents in Indonesia
Merpati Nusantara Airlines accidents and incidents
Accidents and incidents involving the Boeing 737 Classic
April 2010 events in Indonesia